Nigeria does not recognize same-sex marriages or civil unions for same-sex couples. Homosexuality among men is punishable with up to 14 years' imprisonment in Southern Nigeria and may result in capital punishment for men in areas under Sharia Islamic law in the northern part of the country. Individuals who "perform, witness, aid or abets" a same-sex marriage may face severe penalties.

Same Sex Marriage (Prohibition) Act 2013

On January 18, 2007, the Federal Executive Council proposed a bill prohibiting same-sex marriages and urged the National Assembly to pass it urgently. According to the Minister of Justice, Bayo Ojo, the bill was pushed by President Olusegun Obasanjo following the International Conference on AIDS and Sexually Transmitted Infections in Africa (ICASA) in Abuja in 2005. The bill would call for five years' imprisonment for anyone who undergoes, "performs, witnesses, aids, or abets" a same-sex marriage. It would also prohibit any display of a "same-sex amorous relationship" and adoption of children by gays or lesbians. The bill received little to no opposition in Parliament. It would also prescribe five years' imprisonment for involvement in public advocacy or associations supporting the rights of lesbian and gay people, including a ban on any form of relationship with a gay person.

In February 2006, the United States Department of State condemned the bill. In March 2006, 16 international human rights groups signed a letter condemning the law, calling it a violation of freedoms of expression, association and assembly guaranteed by international law as well as by the African Charter on Human and Peoples' Rights and a barrier to the struggle against the spread of HIV/AIDS. An estimated 3 million people live with HIV/AIDS in Nigeria. The bill was not passed before the 2007 elections.

A similar draft bill was proposed in 2013. It states: "A person who registers, operates or participates in gay clubs, societies or organizations, or directly or indirectly makes public show of same-sex amorous relationship in Nigeria commits an offense and is liable on conviction to a term of 10 years." It passed Parliament with little opposition, and was signed into law by President Goodluck Jonathan on January 7, 2014 as the Same Sex Marriage (Prohibition) Act 2013 (SSMPA). The law voids marriage contracts between people of the same sex and bans persons from aiding and abetting same-sex marriages. Proponents of the legislation cited their Christian faith and culture to support the law. Critics contended that local cultures did not explicitly forbid same-sex marriages and relations. For instance, an Ìyá Ṣàngó is a female priestess of Shango, the deity of thunder and lightning in the Yoruba religion, who during trance possession is no longer viewed as a woman and is seen to marry Shango at the metaphysical level, becoming a man.

A case, Mr. Teriah Joseph Ebah v. Federal Republic of Nigeria, challenging the constitutionality of the law was dismissed in October 204 for lack of standing. In 2018, several LGBT activists said to their knowledge that the law had never been used to convict anyone in any same-sex marriage-related case. According to the activists, this is because the law is "incoherent", and many cases involving suspected LGBT persons lack proper evidence, making it "impossible for prosecutors to present a winnable case and prove that any crime has been committed". Nevertheless, "because of this law, the police treat people in any way that they please. They torture, force people to confess, and when they hear about a gathering of men, they just head over to make arrests." In 2018, a group of 47 men were arrested in Lagos for allegedly being "initiated into a gay club". The men said they were attending a birthday party. This case was widely seen as a test case on whether the law could be used to prosecute. Judge Rilwan Aikawa of the Federal High Court of Nigeria dismissed the case for lack of evidence in October 2020. In October 2020, LGBT activists also used the EndSARS and EndPoliceBrutality protests in Nigeria to demand an end to marginalization of the LGBT community in Nigeria.

The Kano State Hisbah Corps arrested 12 young men in January 2015 in Kano on suspicion of planning a same-sex wedding. The men denied it, saying they were planning a friend's birthday party. Similarly, the police force arrested 11 young women in 2018 on charges of planning a lesbian wedding. The women refuted the charges, saying they were celebrating the appointment of their dance club's president. In December 2022, 19 people were arrested on similar charges. None of these cases have resulted in a conviction.

Public opinion
A 2015 opinion poll conducted by NOIPolls in partnership with the Initiative for Equal Rights and the Bisi Alimi Foundation showed that 87% of Nigerians supported the Same Sex Marriage (Prohibition) Act 2013.

See also 
LGBT rights in Nigeria
Same Sex Marriage (Prohibition) Act 2013
Recognition of same-sex unions in Africa

Notes

References 

LGBT rights in Nigeria
Law of Nigeria
Nigeria